Teyck Weed (born April 15, 1949) is a retired American Nordic combined skier who competed in the 1972 Winter Olympics.

References

1949 births
Living people
American male Nordic combined skiers
Olympic Nordic combined skiers of the United States
Nordic combined skiers at the 1972 Winter Olympics